This article lists all power stations in Libya.

Fossil fuel

Combined cycle gas turbine

Oil

Dual fuel (natural gas & oil)

Renewable

Solar

See also 

 Energy in Libya
 List of power stations in Africa
Renewable energy in Africa
Energy in Africa

References 

Libya
Energy in Libya
Power stations